The Varangian Runestones are runestones in Scandinavia that mention voyages to the East or the Eastern route, or to more specific eastern locations such as Garðaríki (which probably meant Rus, what is today Belarus, Russia, and Ukraine).

There are also many additional runestones in Scandinavia that talk of eastward voyages such as the Greece Runestones, Italy Runestones, and inscriptions left by the Varangian Guard. Other runestones that deal with Varangian expeditions include the Serkland Runestones (dealing with expeditions to the Middle East) and the Ingvar Runestones (erected in honor or memory of those who travelled to the Caspian Sea with Ingvar the Far-Travelled). There is also a separate article for the Baltic expeditions runestones. In addition, there were also voyages to Western Europe mentioned on runestones that are treated in the articles Viking Runestones, England Runestones and Hakon Jarl Runestones.

Most of the runestones were raised during the Christianization of the 11th century when the making of runestones was fashionable, but notably, the Kälvesten Runestone Ög 8 was made in the 9th century when the Varangians played a central role in what would become Russia and Ukraine. This vast area was a rich source of pelts, hides and people, and it was an important component in the contemporary Swedish economy. Its Old Norse name meant 'land of fortresses' and was derived from the chains of fortresses that had been constructed along the trade routes.

All of the stones were engraved in Old Norse with the Younger Futhark and the message of many of the inscriptions can be summarized with a poem in the fornyrðislag style found on the Turinge Runestone Sö 338:

Below follows a presentation of the runestones based on the Rundata project. The transcriptions into Old Norse are mostly in the Swedish and Danish dialect to facilitate comparison with the inscriptions, while the English translation provided by Rundata gives the names in the de facto standard dialect (the Icelandic and Norwegian dialect):

Uppland

U 153

This runestone in style Pr3 is one of the runestones in Hagby. It was discovered in 1930 in the basement under the main building of the old estate Lissby which had been demolished in the late 19th century. It had been inserted in the basement wall with the engraved side visible together with the runestones U 152 and U 154. When the basement collapsed, the runestone was splintered into a great number of minor and major pieces of which the top part was the largest one. A fragment of the stone was discovered in the field on the property of Lissby. All in all, no less than 70 pieces were reassembled, and in 1931, the repaired stone was raised in the garden of Hagby. The stone is in granite and it is 2.60 m tall and 1.5 m wide. The inscription is damaged and especially in its beginning and end. It refers to several stones and one of them was probably the runestone U 155.

Latin transliteration:

 

Old Norse transcription:

 

English translation:

 "Sveinn and Ulfr had the stones raised in memory of Halfdan and in memory of Gunnarr, their brothers. They met their end in the east ..."

U 154

This runestone in style Pr3 and it is one of the runestones in Hagby. was discovered together with U 151 in a collapsed basement under the eastern part of the foundation of the main building of the farm Lissby. When it was discovered, it was still standing but it had been crushed and it crumbled into 50 pieces when it was removed from the wall. It was reassembled but the upper part had been lost and could not be retrieved. In 1931, it was raised in the garden of Hagby. The stone is dark and it is 1.23 m tall and 0.3 m wide. The inscription is damaged in several places.

Latin transliteration:

 

Old Norse transcription:

 

English translation:

 "... had raised ... ...-fastr and in memory of Geirbjôrn, (their) brothers ... They died in the east."

U 209

This is not properly a runestone but a runic inscription in style Pr4 that has been carved into flat bedrock at Veda. It is dated to the mid-11th century. It was ordered by Þorsteinn who enriched himself in Kievan Rus' in memory of his son. Omeljan Pritsak identifies this Þorsteinn with Þorsteinn, the former commander of a retinue, who is commemorated on the Turinge Runestone. He suggests that Þorsteinn was the commander of the retinue of Yaroslav the Wise and that his son Erinmundr may have died in Kievan Rus' while serving under his father.

The estate that was bought was probably the farm Veda, where the inscription is located. The inscription is of note as it indicates that the riches that were acquired in Eastern Europe had led to the new procedure of legally buying odal land.

Latin transliteration:

 

Old Norse transcription:

 

English translation:

 "Þorsteinn made (the stone) in memory of Erinmundr, his son, and bought this estate and earned (wealth) in the east in Garðar (Rus)."

U 283

This runestone was located at the estate of Torsåker but it has disappeared. It was presumably in style Pr3 and made by the runemaster Fot. It was raised by three men in memory of a fourth who had died in the east.

Latin transliteration:

 

Old Norse transcription:

 

English translation:

 "Sibbi and Ernmundr and Þórir had the stone raised in memory of ... ... ... He, Gísmundr's son, died in the east."

U 366

This runestone was found as fragments at Gådersta and has disappeared but it was probably in style Pr4. It was raised in memory of a man who died on the eastern route.

Latin transliteration:

 

Old Norse transcription:

 

English translation:

 "... died on the eastern route ..."

U 504

This runestone is an early inscription in style RAK without ornamentations. It is located in Ubby and it was raised in memory of a father who had travelled both in the west and in the east.

Latin transliteration:

 

Old Norse transcription:

 

English translation:

 "Ketilfastr raised this stone in memory of Ásgautr, his father. He was in the west and in the east. May God help his soul."

U 636

This stone is found at Låddersta and it is in the style Fp. It is raised in memory of a son named Arnfast who travelled to Kievan Rus'. Arnfast is also mentioned on the stone U 635.

One interpretation is that it means Garðaríki (Garðar), and another one that it may have referred to Kiev as Garðr.

Latin transliteration:

 

Old Norse transcription:

 

English translation:

 "Ôlvé had this stone raised in memory of Arnfast, his son. He travelled to the east to Garðar (Kievan Rus)."

U 687

This stone, signed by the runemaster Öpir, is found at Sjusta near Skokloster. It is in style Pr4 and it is raised by a woman named Rúna in memory of her four sons who had died. She had it made together with her daughter-in-law Sigríðr who was the widow of Spjallboði.

In 1875, Richard Dybeck suggested that  represented Old Norse  meaning 'Greece', but in 1891 Sophus Bugge read , which means 'retinue'. 'in Saint Olaf's Church in Novgorod'. von Friesen's interpretation has since then been the accepted interpretation.

Omeljan Pritsak suggests that Spjallboði died in a fire that destroyed the church in c. 1070–1080. Jansson, on the other hand, attributes the death of Spjallboði in a church to the fact that many of the medieval churches were defensive structures.

The runic text is signed by the runemaster Öpir, who was active during the late 11th and early 12th centuries in Uppland.

Latin transliteration:

 

Old Norse transcription:

 

English translation:

 "Rúna had the landmark made in memory of Spjallboði and in memory of Sveinn and in memory of Andvéttr and in memory of Ragnarr, sons of her and Helgi/Egli/Engli; and Sigríðr in memory of Spjallboði, her husbandman. He died in Holmgarðr in Ólafr's church. Œpir carved the runes."

U 898

This is not properly a runestone but a runic inscription on flat bedrock at Norby. It is in style Pr4 and it is raised in memory of three men, one of whom died in the East. The runic text is signed by the runemaster Öpir.

Latin transliteration:

 

Old Norse transcription:

 

English translation:

 "Áli/Alli and Jôfurfast had the landmark made in memory of Jarl, their father, and in memory of Gísl and in memory of Ingimundr. He, Jarl's son, was killed in the east. Œpir carved."

Södermanland

Sö 33

This runestone is located in Skåäng and it is the style Fp. It was raised in memory of a man who died in an assembly in the east. It is also possible that it says that the man died in a retinue in the east.

Latin transliteration:

 

Old Norse transcription:

 

English translation:

 "Gnúpa had this stone raised in memory of Gulleifr, his brother. He met his end in the east at the Assembly."

Sö 34

This runestone is located at a path called Tjuvstigen ('thief trail') and is carved in runestone style KB. This is the classification for inscriptions with a cross that is bordered by the runic text. This same phrase is used in its singular form on runestones Vg 8 from Hjälstad and DR 143 from Gunderup. About fifty memorial runestones describe the deceased as being a thegn.

Latin transliteration:

Old Norse transcription:

 

English translation:

 "Styrlaugr and Holmr raised the stones next to the path in memory of their brothers. They met their end on the eastern route, Þorkell and Styrbjôrn, good Þegns."

Sö 92

This runestone is found at the cemetery of Husby. Its front side is completely covered in illustrations and it is attributed to style Pr3-Pr4. It was carved by the runemaster Balle in memory of someone's brother who died in the East.

Latin transliteration:

Old Norse transcription:

 

English translation:

 "... had the stone raised ... Rysja(?), his brother. He ... east. Balli ..."

Sö 121

This runestone has disappeared but was located in Bönestad. It was made in the style RAK in memory of a man who died in the East.

Latin transliteration:

Old Norse transcription:

 

English translation:

 "<sumuʀ> cut the stone, who died in the east in <tuna> ..."

Sö 126

This runestone is a runic inscription on flat bedrock in Fagerlöt. It is in the style Pr2-Pr3 and it was made in memory of a man named Áskell who fell in battle in the East. The second sentence of the inscription is in the meter fornyrðislag, and it contains a virtually unique use of the Old Norse word  ('cruel') in the sense "commander". Áskell's title  may be the title that the commander had in the druzhina of Yaroslav I the Wise in Novgorod.

Latin transliteration:

Old Norse transcription:

 

English translation:

 "Holmfríðr (and) <ilin--r>, they had the stone cut in memory of Áskell, their father. He engaged in battle on the eastern route, before the people's commander wrought his fall."

Sö 130

This runestone is found near a homestead named Hagstugan. It is either style Fp or possibly style Pr1 and it is raised in memory of a man who fell in what is today Russia. It is composed in fornyrðislag and the last line, which contains cipher runes, was decoded by Elias Wessén. It is from the first half of the 11th century.

Latin transliteration:

 A 
 B 

Old Norse transcription:

 A 
B 

English translation:

 A "Four (sons) made the magnificence in memory of (their) good father, valiantly in memory of Dómari/the judge, gentle in speech and free with food ..."
 B "He(?) fell(?) in(?) Garðar(?) (Rus) ..."

Sö 148

This runestone is found in Innberga and it was raised in memory of a man who died in what is today Russia. It is dated to the first half of the 11th century.

Latin transliteration:

Old Norse transcription:

 

English translation:

 "Þjóðulfr (and) Búi, they raised this stone in memory of Farulfr, their father. He met his end in the east in Garðar (Rus)."

Sö 171

This runestone is a boulder that was found in Esta, and it was made in memory of the captain of a ship who died in Novgorod. The boulder is badly damaged due to weathering, but thanks to a 17th-century drawing scholars know what it said. Three parts of the stone are located in the Swedish Museum of National Antiquities in Stockholm.

According to Jansson, the runestone testifies to the unrest that could appear in the important marketplace of Novgorod, and it was not only the captain who died, but also the entire crew. Omeljan Pritsak, on the other hand, thinks that the deceased had probably died in the service of the Novgorodian prince in the first half of the 11th century. The second half of the inscription is in the fornyrðislag meter.

Latin transliteration:

 

Old Norse transcription:

 

English translation:

 "Ingifastr had the stone cut in memory of Sigviðr, his father. He fell in Holmgarðr, the ship's leader with the seamen."

Sö 216

This runestone was found as a fragment in Aska, but it has disappeared. What remained said that it was made in memory of a man who died in the East.

Latin transliteration:

Old Norse transcription:

 

English translation:

 "Óttarr and ... ... met his end in the east ..."

Sö 308

This runestone is a runic inscription by the runemaster Öpir in the style Pr5 on a large boulder. It is located outside the railroad station in Södertälje. It was made in memory of two men who were in the east.

Latin transliteration:

Old Norse transcription:

 

English translation:

 "Holmfastr (and) Hróðelfr had the runes carved in memory of ... ... Ingifastr, their sons. They were in the east(?). And Œpir carved."

Sö 338

This is a runestone raised in the church of Turinge. It is in sandstone, in the style Pr4 and it was made in memory of the chieftain of a warband. It is the most verbose of all the Varangian stones, and it was probably made in the mid-11th century.

Omeljan Pritsak identifies this Þorsteinn with Þorsteinn of the Veda inscription, who bought an estate for his son with money earned in Kievan Rus'. He suggests that Þorsteinn was the commander of the retinue of Yaroslav I the Wise and that his son Erinmundr may have died in Kievan Rus' while serving under his father.

Latin transliteration:

 A 
 B 

Old Norse transcription:

 A 
 B 

English translation:

 A "Ketill and Bjôrn, they raised this stone in memory of Þorsteinn, their father; Ônundr in memory of his brother and the housecarls in memory of the just(?) (and) Ketiley in memory of her husbandman. These brothers were the best of men in the land and abroad in the retinue, held their housecarls well."
 B "He fell in battle in the east in Garðar (Kievan Rus), commander of the retinue, the best of landholders."

Västmanland

Vs 1

This runestone was discovered in 1932 in the ruins of the church of Stora Rytterne. It forms a monument together with image stone Vs 2, and it was raised in memory of a son who died either in what is today Russia or in Khwarezm in Persia.

However, in 1946, he discovered that it may refer to Khwarezm in Central Asia. He proposed that it may be one of the Ingvar Runestones and that it tells where the Ingvar expedition ultimately ended in 1041. The archaeologist Ture J. Arne criticized this analysis claiming that although a Viking chieftain could arrive to the Caspian Sea in 922, when Vikings met Ibn Fadlan, such a voyage would not have been possible in the 1040s. Arne instead accepted Jansson's first analysis of the inscription.

The Rundata project retains Khwarezm as an equal possibility, and Omeljan Pritsak notes that  agrees with *qarus-m which is what the Middle Turkic form of Khwarezm would have been.  Moreover, Pritsak notes that Arne was wrong in his claim that it would have been impossible for Ingvar to go to Kwarezm at the time. On the contrary, there were no obstacles for such a voyage during the period 1035–1041.

The inscription is somewhat unusual in that the sponsor's name , which is the first word in the inscription, is preceded and followed by a cross, perhaps done to draw attention.

Latin transliteration:

 

Old Norse transcription:

 

English translation:

 "Guðleifr placed the staff and these stones in memory of Slagvi, his son, (who) met his end in the east in Garðar(?)/Chorezm(?)."

Vs Fv1988;36

This runestone is carved in runestone style Fp and was raised in memory of Grímmundr who travelled to the east. It was discovered in 1986 at Jädra near Västerås, when stones were removed from a field. It is a lightly reddish stone which is granular and finely textured. The surface of the inscription is even but it is damaged due to flaking, making parts of the inscription difficult to read. It is 2.27 m tall, 0.9 m wide and 0.33 m thick. It is of note that the inscription when discovered still carried traces of its original colouring, which was determined to be of iron oxide but without any noticeable traces of binding material. The nuance appears to have been the same the one used by the Department of Runes when repainting runes in modern days. The stone is of historic note as it mentions the construction of a bridge on the old trail from Badelunda and lake Mälaren to the district of Dalarna.

The Rundata designation for this Västmanland inscription, Vs Fv1988;36, refers to the year and page number of the issue of Fornvännen in which the runestone was first described.

Latin transliteration:

 

Old Norse transcription:

 

English translation:

 "Taf(?) had this stone raised in memory of Grímmundr. The son of Viðfastr travelled to the east. Ulfr and Vébjôrn ... Ketilas(?)/Ketilhôss(?) made the bridge at ..."

Östergötland

Ög 8

The Kälvesten stone in Östergötland is dated to the 9th century. It is the oldest inscription that mentions a Viking chieftain leading an expedition eastwards, and many other chieftains would follow in his wake. Unfortunately, it does not tell the exact destination of the Viking expedition.

In the inscription, the runes aukrimulfʀ are to be read as auk krimulfʀ and the k rune, thus represents two letters at the same time. The runes represent the common Norse name Grímulfr, which was in use all over Scandinavia. It is of note that the name appears in such an old runestone as the other runic attestations of the name are considerably younger, and the name was common in medieval Norway. The name of the deceased, Eyvindr, is a common name in Swedish runic inscriptions, but not Eivísl, the name of the chieftain of the expedition. The only other secure attestation appears on the contemporary Sparlösa Runestone in Västergötland. Since the name appears on two runestones from roughly the same time and in two districts that were culturally closely connected, the name may refer to the same person on the two runestones. Unfortunately, the Sparlösa Runestone is damaged in several places and although it mentions a battle and although there are images like birds hovering above the rigging of a ship, scholars cannot be certain that it refers to a chieftain who had fallen in battle. The idenfication between the name Eivísl on the two runestones will remain a hypothesis.

Latin transliteration:

 A 
 B 

Old Norse transcription:

 A 
 B 

English translation:

 A "Styggr/Stigr made this monument in memory of Eyvindr, his son. He fell in the east"
 B "with Eivísl. Víkingr coloured and Grímulfr."

Ög 30

This runestone is found at Skjorstad. It is in the style Fp and it was raised in memory of a man named Ingvarr who died in the East.

Latin transliteration:

 

Old Norse transcription:

 

English translation:

 "Sigsteinn had this stone raised in memory of Ingvarr, his son. He died in the east."

Västergötland

Vg 135

This runestone has disappeared but was found in the village of Hassla. It was in the style RAK and it was raised in memory of a brother who died on the eastern route.

Latin transliteration:

 

Old Norse transcription:

 

English translation:

 "Brandr raised this stone in memory of Ásmundr(?), his brother; he was killed on the eastern route(?)."

Vg 184

This runestone was raised in the cemetery of the church of Smula, but has been moved to the grounds of Dagsnäs Castle. It is carved in the style Fp and it is raised in memory of a brother who died as a warrior in the east. He may have been a member of the Varangian Guard.

Latin transliteration:

 

Old Norse transcription:

 

English translation:

 "Gulli/Kolli raised this stone in memory of his wife's brothers Ásbjôrn and Juli, very good valiant men. And they died in the east in the retinue."

Vg 197

This runestone is raised on the cemetery of the church of Dalum. It was raised in memory of a two brothers, one of whom died in the west while the other one died in the east.

Latin transliteration:

 

Old Norse transcription:

 

English translation:

 "Tóki and his brothers raised this stone in memory of their brothers. One died in the west, another in the east."

Öland

Öl 28 (58)

This runestone is raised on the cemetery of Gårdby and it is raised in memory of a man who either stayed in what is today Russia or in a nearby location. It is dated to the period 1020–1050.

Latin transliteration:

 P 
 Q 

Old Norse transcription:

 P 
 Q 

English translation:

 P "Herþrúðr raised this stone in memory of her son Smiðr, a good valiant man. Halfborinn, his brother, sits in Garðar (Russia). Brandr cut rightly, for whoever can interpret (the runes)."
 Q "Herþrúðr raised this stone in memory of her son Smiðr, a good valiant man. His halfbrother Brandr sits in Garðir. Cut rightly into, for whoever can interpret (the runes)."

Gotland
There are only about ten runestones on Gotland that commemorate men who died in foreign lands, which appears to challenge the common view that the island was "the international trade center of the Viking Age". Four of these runestones mention East European place names.

G 114

This runestone refers to a man who was in a place called karþum. One view holds that the place name is Garðar, i.e. Garðaríki (Russia), and another view is that the name refers to Garda Parish not far from the stone. Omeljan Pritsak holds the first view to be the correct one, since having been to a neighbouring parish hardly merits a mention on a runestone. It is probably from the first half of the 11th century.

Latin transliteration:

 A : 
 B 
 C 
 D 

Old Norse transcription:

 A 
 B 
 C 
 D 

English translation:

 A "The sons of Líknhvatr ... the good landmark made in memory of Eilíkn, a good wife, mother ..."
 B "and Geirhvatr and Líknvé."
 C "God ... be gracious to her and those making the landmark ... ... who men"
 D "... in Garðir/Garde, he was with Vivi(?) ... ..."

G 134

The stones G 134 and G 135 tell about the same family, and there is also an additional runestone about the same people, G 136. These runestones tell of a common situation for Scandinavian families in the 11th century: one son was killed through treason in the South, possibly as a member of the Varangian Guard, and another son died in Vindau (Ventspils, Latvia).

The men who betrayed Hróðfúss were according to the runestone blökumenn ('black men') and most scholars interpret them as Walachians, but others, such as Omeljan Pritsak, argue in favour of a theory that they were Polovtsians. This theory was proposed in 1929 by Akeksej I. Sobolevskij, and he suggested that  was connected to a Central European name for the Kipchak (Qipčaq) Polovcians (Qūmans), which was Blawen, Blauen and a translation of the Slavic Plavci. All the Old Norse information on the  date to the period 1016–1017 in the case of Eymundar þáttr and to 1122 concerning the Berroa battle (Saint Olaf's miracles), but the first mention of the Wallachians is in Niketas Choniates'  and it concerns an event in 1164. Moreover, Pritsak notes that ON  also had the meaning 'pale' which designated the first ruling horde of the Kipchaks who were one of the most important nomadic peoples in the 11th and 12th centuries.

Latin transliteration:

 

Old Norse transcription:

 

English translation:

 "Hróðvísl and Hróðelfr, they had the stones raised in memory of (their) three sons. This (one) in memory of Hróðfúss. Wallachians betrayed him on a voyage. May God help Hróðfúss' soul. May God betray those who betrayed him."

G 220

This runestone is found in a museum in Gotland. It is a fragment of a runestone made of limestone and it was made in memory of a man who died in Novgorod. The inscription testifies to the intense contacts that existed between Gotland and Novgorod, where the Gotlanders had a trading station of their own.

Latin transliteration:

 

Old Norse transcription:

 

English translation:

 "... Oddgeirr/Bótgeirr. He died in Holmgarðir ..."

G 280

This runestone was found in Pilgårds, but is now located in a museum on Gotland. It was dated to the last half of the 10th century by Wolfgang Krause. When they arrived at Rvanyj Kamin' (Rufstain), Rafn was killed and the crew raised stones in his memory south of it.

Latin transliteration:

 

Old Norse transcription:

 

English translation:

 "Hegbjôrn raised this stone glaring (and his) brothers Hróðvísl, Eysteinn, Emundr(?), who have had stones raised in memory of Hrafn south of Rofstein. They came far and wide in Eifor. Vífill bade .."

Denmark

DR 108

This runestone is found in Kolind in Syddjurs Municipality, Denmark. It is in style RAK and it was raised in memory of a brother who died in the east.

Latin transliteration:

 

Old Norse transcription:

 

English translation:

 "Tosti, Ásviðr's smith, raised this stone in memory of Tófi, his brother, who died in the east."

Norway

N 62

This runic inscription is found on the same stone as N 61, and they tell of the same clan. Bjørn Hougen dated N 61 to 1000-1030 and Magnus Olsen dated N 62 to the 1060s. It is in short-twig runes.

It relates of a man who died in a location in Eastern Europe, and there has been some scholarly debate on exactly where. In 1961, an archaeological excavation in Vitičev, near Kiev, by B. A. Rybakov and Boris Kleiber, provided a solution. They discovered a beacon which had given fire signals to Kiev, and in Old Norse such a beacon was called a viti. The name Vitičev has no Slavic etymology, and so Kleiber suggested that its original name was Vitičev xolm, i.e. Vitaholmi. The name Vitičev would originally have been Vitiča, a suffixed borrowing of viti. Kleiber analysed the first part of the second Vitaholmi as usta, a genitive of an *usti which would have been how the Norse rendered the Slavic toponym Ustja (Zarub). Ustja was located on a hill near a ford across the Trubež, a tributary of the Dniepr. According to Kleiber, Garða is a shortened form of Kœnugarðar, the Old Norse name for Kiev. This solution reads the location of Þóraldr's death as "in Vitičev between Ustja and Kiev".

Kleiber suggests that Engli was a member of Eymund's warband which fought in Kievan Rus' during the first half of the 11th century.

Latin transliteration:

 

Old Norse transcription:

 

English translation:

 "Engli raised this stone in memory of Þóraldr, his son, who died in Vitaholmr - between Vitaholmr and Garðar (Rus)."

See also
Berezan' Runestone
List of runestones
Trade route from the Varangians to the Greeks

Notes

Sources
Harrison, D. & Svensson, K. (2007). Vikingaliv. Fälth & Hässler, Värnamo. 
Jones, Gwyn (1968). A History of the Vikings. New York: Oxford University Press.
Jansson, Sven B. F. (1980). Runstenar. STF, Stockholm. 
Jansson, Sven B. F (1987). Runes in Sweden. Stockholm, Gidlund. 
Larsson, Mats G. (2002). Götarnas Riken : Upptäcktsfärder Till Sveriges Enande. Bokförlaget Atlantis AB 

Peterson, Lena (2002). Nordisk Runnamnslexikon. Swedish Institute for Linguistics and Heritage (Institutet för språk och folkminnen).

Project Samnordisk Runtextdatabas Svensk - Rundata

External links
An English Dictionary of Runic Inscriptions of the Younger Futhark, at the university of Nottingham

Runestones in Uppland
Runestones in Östergötland
Runestones in Södermanland
Runestones in memory of Viking warriors
Kievan Rus'
Runestones